The Chikoy (Tsökh gol; , Sükhe gol) is a river in Zabaykalsky Krai and the Buryat Republic in Russia, which partially flows along the Russia-Mongolia border. It is a right tributary of the Selenga.

Course
The Chikoy has its source in the Chikokon Range, in the northern slopes of the Bystrinsky Golets peak. Its valley forms the northwestern limit of the Khentei-Daur Highlands.
The river usually freezes over in late October or early November and stays icebound until April or early May. Its largest tributary is the Menza.

See also
List of rivers of Russia
Chikoy National Park
Selenga Highlands

References

External links

Rivers of Zabaykalsky Krai
Rivers of Buryatia
Rivers of Mongolia
Mongolia–Russia border